Sønder Vedby Skovhuse is a village  east of Nykøbing on the Danish island of Falster. Today it serves as a satellite village for Nykøbing. As of 2022, it has a population of 292.

History
With time, the south side of Sønder Vedby was acquired by Orupgård. Around 1900, an impressive two-storey building, partly half-timbered, was built for the estate's kvægforvalteren or cattle administrator. For many years it was used as a roebørnehave, a day nursery for children whose parents were picking sugarbeet in the surrounding fields.

References

Falster
Cities and towns in Region Zealand
Guldborgsund Municipality